AerCaribe S.A., operating as AerCaribe, is a Colombia-based carrier operating both domestic and Americas-wide executive, charter and cargo services, as well as specialized fuel and military transport. The carrier is based at Bogota's El Dorado International Airport with a secondary hub at Lima's Jorge Chávez International Airport operating as AerCaribe Peru, and operates a fleet of turboprop and jet aircraft.

History
AerCaribe began operations in 2006 with a fleet of Antonov turboprop aircraft, with domestic services in Colombia. AerCaribe operates its own 3,000sqm hangar at El Dorado, with departure and VIP lounges, conference rooms, and a restaurant. The carrier is certified by Antonov to offer maintenance and restoration works on Antonov aircraft in Colombia and Latin America, as well to act as a representative of Antonov in the sale and purchase of Antonov aircraft.

In 2011, AerCaribe launched its first subsidiary, AerCaribe S.A.C. Peru, operating as AerCaribe Peru. It is a Peruvian-based carrier which operates scheduled and charter cargo services from its base in Lima Jorge Chávez International Airport within Peru.

In 2015, AerCaribe received its first of three converted B737-300P2Fs (passenger to freighter) from PEMCO World Air Services, in Tampa, US. The aircraft offers 11 pallet positions, a full-featured cargo loading system with retractable sill plate and over-rideable side restraints, all engineered to deliver good reliability and a 48,000lbs (22 tonnes) maximum payload.

In 2019, it was announced that AerCaribe was looking into commencing operations from its base in Colombia, and its sub-base in Peru under its subsidiary AerCaribe Peru, to the United States.

On 14th October 2020, one of the An-32s crashed while landing in Iquitos. The aircraft was destroyed, but the crew survived.

Destinations
AerCaribe and AerCaribe Peru both offer scheduled and charter cargo services from their respective bases within Colombia, South, Central America, and the Caribbean, as well as within Peru.

Fleet
The AerCaribe and AerCaribe Peru fleet consists of the following aircraft (as of April 2020):

Accidents and Incidents
On 28th January 2017, an AerCaribe Peru 737-400 freighter overran the runway while landing in Leticia, tearing off the main landing gear. The aircraft was damaged beyond repair.

On 14th October 2020, an AerCaribe Colombia An-32 veered off the runway in Iquitos, ripping off the wings and landing gear, starting a fire. All the crew members survived, but the aircraft was destroyed by fire.

See also
List of airlines of Colombia
List of airlines of Peru

References

Airlines of Colombia
1997 establishments in Colombia